HLA-DR51 is a HLA-DR serotype that recognizes the antigens encoded by the minor DR locus HLA-DRB5.

DRB3, DRB4, and DRB5 are minor DR beta encoding loci, they have been recognized as having distinct evolution, having diverged from DRB1 approximately 4 million years ago.

DRB5 locus is only apparent in a small subset of DR haplotypes, and most individuals lack DRB5.

Alleles

DRB5* is subdivided into two allele groups, DRB5*01 and DRB5*02.  B5*01 encodes 14 alleles and 11 isoforms. B5*02 encoded 4 alleles that can generate 4 isoforms. Only 3 of these have been surveyed by serotyping. There are numerous null genes at this locus.

DRB5*01 allele group
 14 Alleles: 11 proteins, 2 Nulls
 DR51 Serotype: *0101, *0102
 Serotype unknown: *0103 to *0107, *0109, *0110 to *0113
 Nulls: *0108N, *0110N

DRB5*02 allele group
 4 Alleles: 4 proteins
 DR51 Serotype: *0202,
 Serotype unknown: *0203 to *0205

Associated diseases

DR51 serotype is positively associated with The following HLA-DRB5 alleles are associated with disease:

DRB5*0101:DRB1*1501 Multiple sclerosis, leprosy

DRB1 linkage
HLA-DRB5 (DR51)is linked to the following HLA-DR serotypes and DRB1 allele groups.

HLA-DR2
 HLA-DR15 - DRB1*15
 HLA-DR16 - DRB1*16

References

HLA-DR haplotypes